Robin Alan Butlin  (born 1938) is emeritus professor of geography, and visiting research fellow, based in the School of Geography at the University of Leeds. Robin was a professor of historical geography and started work at Leeds in 1998 as a visiting professor of geography after working as principal and professor of historical geography at the University College of Ripon and York St John in York.

Academic Posts 
 2003 to present Emeritus professor of geography, and visiting research fellow, School of Geography, University of Leeds
 2000 to 2003 Professor of historical geography (part-time), School of Geography, University of Leeds, Leeds, U.K.
 1998 to 2000 Visiting professor of geography, School of Geography, University of Leeds, Leeds, U.K.
 1998 to 1999 Associate lecturer, Department of Geography, University of Cambridge, Cambridge, U.K.
 1995 to 1998 Principal and professor of historical geography, University College of Ripon and York St John, York, U.K.
 1986 to 1987 Visiting professorial fellow and Leverhulme research fellow, Wolfson College, Cambridge, U.K.
 1983 to 1986 Dean, School (Faculty) of Human and Environmental Studies, Loughborough University of Technology, Loughborough, U.K.
 1979 to 1995 Professor of geography, Loughborough University of Technology, Loughborough, U.K.
 1971 to 1979 Lecturer in geography, Queen Mary College, University of London (Senior lecturer from 1975, reader in historical geography from 1977), London, U.K.
 1970 (Summer School) Visiting associate professor, Department of Geography, Hayward State University, California, U.S.A.
 1969 to 1970 Visiting associate professor of geography, University of Nebraska, Lincoln, Nebraska, U.S.A.
 1965 (One term) Visiting associate professor, Department of Geography, Miami University, Oxford, Ohio, U.S.A.
 1962 to 1971 Lecturer in geography, University College, Dublin, Dublin, Ireland
 1961 to 1962 Demonstrator in geography, University College of North Staffordshire, Keele, U.K.

Qualifications and education 
 1987 D.Litt. conferred by Loughborough University, for published work in Historical Geography, submitted under the title Studies in Historical Geography.
 1959 to 1961 M.A. (by research), Geography, University of Liverpool. Thesis on The Evolution of the Agrarian Landscape of Northumberland, 1500-1900.
 1956 to 1959 B.A. (Upper Second Class Honours), Geography, University of Liverpool. Jointly Awarded P.M. Roxby Memorial Prize for best student dissertation, on the Historical Geography of the Brue Valley of Central Somerset.

Membership of learned societies 
 Royal Geographical Society with the Institute of British Geographers
 Association of American Geographers
 Royal Scottish Geographical Society
 Geographical Society of Ireland
 British Economic History Society
 British Agricultural History Society
 Palestine Exploration Fund
 Geographical Association
 European Conference for the Study of Rural Landscape

Awards and Appointments 
 2004 Appointed O.B.E. 'for services to geography'.
 2002 Chair, Yorkshire regional committee of the Royal Geographical Society with the Institute of British Geographers
 1999 Awarded Victoria Medal by the Royal Geographical Society with the Institute of British Geographers, for contributions to historical geography
 1995-98 Vice-President, Research and Higher Education Division, Royal Geographical Society with the Institute of British Geographers

External links 

Robin Butlin's School of Geography University of Leeds Web Page

References 

British geographers
Living people
Academics of the University of Leeds
Fellows of the Royal Geographical Society
Officers of the Order of the British Empire
Alumni of Loughborough University
1938 births
Historical geographers
Victoria Medal recipients